The National Association of Railway Clubs is an autonomous association whose members are sports and social clubs in England, Scotland and Wales.  It offers administration and support to its members.  The Association was originally the British Railways Staff Association, becoming independent of British Railways and serving a broader community in 1990.

The Association is made of five regional organisations based on former British Rail regions:
 Federation of Railway Clubs Eastern
 London Midland Railway Clubs Association
 Railway Staff Association for Scotland
 National Association of Railway Clubs (Southern Region)
 Great Western Railway Staff Association

References 

Rail transport in the United Kingdom
Clubs and societies in the United Kingdom